Franz Moishe Kempf   (20 June 1926 – 8 February 2020) was an Australian artist who worked in Australia and Europe. He was a lecturer in printmaking at the University of Adelaide.

Early life and education
Kempf was born in Melbourne on 20 June 1926 and studied at the National Gallery of Victoria Art School, then (between 1957 and 1960) in Perugia, Italy and with Oscar Kokoschka in Salzburg, Austria. In England he worked as a film designer with Richard Macdonald, and was associated with Peter Blake, Joe Tilson, Ceri Richards and Keith Vaughan. Vaughan had an influence on Kempf’s work of the 1960s.

Career
Kempf worked with and in a variety of media, styles and methods including paint, print, etching, lithograph, monotype, screenprint, textile and woodcut.

Kempf moved to Adelaide, South Australia, in 1963, becoming head of printmaking at the then North Adelaide School of Arts in 1969. He was senior lecturer in printmaking at the University of South Australia from 1973 to 1981, and a guest lecturer at the Slade School of Fine Art, the University of London, the Edinburgh College of Art, Scotland and the Gloucester College of Art. He participated in over 90 one-man invitation exhibitions in America, Israel, Germany, Poland and China.

His thought and work was influenced by  Jewish mysticism, Isaac Bashevis Singer, Cavafy and Proust. In his work, he covered subjects from political issues and the natural environment to the spiritual traditions in Judaism. Although from a non-observant background, Kempf turned to following the Chabad movement of Hasidic Judaism, becoming strictly observant.

Professor Sasha Grishin described him as

Honours and recognition
In 1964, he was elected as a Fellow of the Royal Society UK and in January 2003, was appointed a Member of the Order of Australia for his contribution to the Arts.

Death and legacy
Kempf died in Adelaide on 8 February 2020. He was married to Tamar, and left two children and several grandchildren and great-grandchildren.

The Carclew, an arts centre for youth in North Adelaide, manages the IAF (Independent Arts Foundation) Franz Kempf Printmaker Award, awarded biennially to support the professional development of a young South Australian printmaker. The funding for the  award was provided as a gift from Kempf to the Independent Arts Foundation, of which he was a longtime member.

The Franz Kempf Memorial Gallery in the Adelaide Holocaust Museum and Andrew Steiner Education Centre (opened in November 2020) contains work by Kempf..

Publications
 ‘Art in Israel’. Broadsheet, Contemporary Art Society, August 1965, pp. 5–7
 ‘Polish Printmakers 1972’, Art and Australia 10,3,1973, pp. 236
 ‘Sculpture in South Australia’, Art and Australia 12, 1, 1974, pp. 46–7
 
 Etchings for Shmuel Gorr, ‘The End of Days’, The Jewish Observer V, 5, October 1968, pp. 16–18, and Shmuel Gorr, ‘The End of Days’, Melbourne: The Levite Press, (1968)
 Ultimate Goal, Franz Kempf, Generation Vol 3 No 4, General Journal Inc, Melbourne Victoria

Collections 
Kempf's work is held in the following institutions:

 Victoria and Albert Museum, London
 Betsalel National Museum, Jerusalem
 Mishkenot Sha’ananim, Jerusalem
 Beit Hanassi, Jerusalem
 Jewish Museum of Australia, Melbourne
 Exeter University, Exeter
 Australian National Gallery, Canberra
 Art Bank, Sydney NSW
 Art Gallery of South Australia, Adelaide
 National Gallery of Victoria, Melbourne
 Art Gallery of Western Australia, Perth
 Geelong Art Gallery, Geelong
 Mildura Arts Centre, Mildura
 Newcastle Regional Art Gallery, Newcastle
 Bendigo Art Gallery, Bendigo
 Benalla Art Gallery, Victoria
 Warrnambool Art Gallery, Warrnambool
 Flinders University Art Museum, Flinders University
 University of Adelaide
 University of Melbourne
 Reserve Bank of Australia
 Nillumbik Art Collection
 Broken Hill Proprietary House Collection
 Wollongong City Art Gallery
 Swan Hill Gallery of Contemporary Art
 Premier’s Department, New South Wales
 University of South Australia
 Wagga Wagga Art Gallery, New South Wales
 New England Regional Art Museum, Armidale
 St Ann's College, Adelaide
 Queen Victoria Museum, Tasmania
 Tasmanian Museum and Art Gallery, Tasmania
 Waite Agricultural Research Institute, Adelaide
 Hilton International Hotel, Adelaide
 Parliament House, Canberra, ACT
 Australian National University, Canberra, ACT
 National Museum of Australia, Canberra, ACT
 Guandong Museum of Art China, China
 Victorian Arts Centre, Melbourne

References

Further reading
 Ashkenazi, Susie, ‘New Paintings by Franz Kempf’, Jewish News, May 1995
 Dutkiewicz, Adam, ‘Reflections on Life’s Journey’, Advertiser, September 1997
 Dutkiewicz, Adam, ‘Romantic Landscape in the Abstract’, Advertiser, December 1994
 Emery, John, ‘Kempf uncovered’, Advertiser, May 1991
 Grishin, Sasha, ‘The Voyages of Franz Kempf’, Franz Kempf Recent Work, BMG Art, Adelaide, 1997
 Grishin, Sasha, ‘Discord in Harmony’, Franz Kempf Recent Work, BMG Art,
 Grishin, Sasha, Discord in Harmony’, Franz Kempf Recent Work, Flinders Lane Gallery, Melbourne, 1995
 Grishin, Sasha, ‘Franz Kempf Works on Paper’, Flinders University Art Museum, 2002
 Harris, Samela, ‘Outsiders and Witnesses in Art’, Advertiser, September 1995
 Jawary, Anita, ‘Insights into a Creative Life’, Australian Jewish News, Melbourne edition, November 1992
 de Jong-Duldig, Eva, ‘Printmaker Presents a Fascinating Look at Life’, Arts/Review, April 1993
 Kronenberg, Simon, ‘An Exhibition of Contemporary Art’, Jewish Festival of Art, Westpac Gallery, Victorian Art Centre, Melbourne, 1993
 Larkin, John, ‘Return of a Graduate from the Academy of Free Spirit’, Melbourne Age, May 1995
 Larkin, John, ‘The View from Within and Above, Franz Kempf Recent Work, BMG Art 2000
 Lloyd, Tim, ‘Abstract Meets Landscape’, Advertiser, December 1994
 McDonald, Katherine, ‘Henri Worland Print Award, 1972-1992’, Warrnambool Art Gallery, Victoria
 Neylon, John, ‘Most Documented Living’, Adelaide Review, 1991
 Smith, Dr Ernest and Smith, Robert, ‘Franz Kempf The Painter as Printmaker 1955-1992’, Mildura Art Gallery, Swan Hill Regional Gallery, McClelland Gallery, Langwarrin
 Lloyd, Tim, ‘Infinite Possibilities’, The Advertiser, 20 October 2002
 Neylon, John, ‘Thinking on Paper’, The Adelaide Review, October 2002

D. Peters, Franz Kempf and Karin Schepers, Museum of Modern Art and Design (1964)
R. Brooks, Franz Kempf (1991)

External links
 Artist's homepage

1926 births
Australian printmakers
2020 deaths
Members of the Order of Australia
Artists from Melbourne